Tertenia is a comune (municipality) in the Province of Nuoro in the Italian region Sardinia, located about  northeast of Cagliari and about  south of Tortolì.

Tertenia borders the following municipalities: Cardedu, Gairo, Jerzu, Lanusei, Loceri, Osini, Ulassai.

It is located in a high valley at the base of Mt. Arbu and Mt. Ferru, along the Rio Quirra river.

References

Cities and towns in Sardinia